Ida Nielsen can refer to:

 Ida Kristine Nielsen (born 1975), Danish bassplayer, composer and vocalist
 Ida Marie Baad Nielsen (born 1992), Danish sailor